The European Laboratory for Learning and Intelligent Systems (ELLIS) is a pan-European nonprofit organization for the promotion of artificial intelligence with a focus on machine learning. The organization's goal is to establish top AI research institutes, strengthen basic research and create a European PhD programme for AI.

History 
The organization was inspired by the Learning in Machines and Brains program of the Canadian Institute for Advanced Research. ELLIS was first proposed in an open letter to European governments in April 2018, which stated that Europe was not keeping up with the US and China. It urged that European governments act to provide opportunities and funding for world-class AI research in Europe.

It was founded on 6 December 2018 at the Conference on Neural Information Processing Systems (NeurIPS).

Board 
The members of the board are:

 Barbara Caputo
 Nuria Oliver
 Bernhard Schölkopf (chairman)
 Max Welling

ELLIS research groups 
ELLIS has set up so-called ELLIS units, research groups, at 30 locations. In an open competition, the research groups were selected by an international commission of scientists according to their scientific excellence in the field.

These institutions will invest 300 million euros in artificial intelligence research over the next 5 years.

Research programmes 
ELLIS set up 11 research programmes. The research programmes have been selected by an international commission.

References 

Artificial intelligence associations
2018 establishments in Europe
Organizations established in 2018